Rory Feely (born 3 January 1997) is an Irish professional footballer who plays for EFL League Two club Barrow. He previously played for Bohemians after two spells at St Patrick's Athletic where he started his professional career, having also previously spent 2 seasons at Waterford.

Club career

Early career
Feely started playing football with Tramore AFC. He then played for Athy Town, where he represented the Kildare & District Underage League at the Kennedy Cup. His performances at the Kennedy Cup earned him a move to League of Ireland Champions St Patrick's Athletic in 2014, where he started playing with the Under 19 side. His first season was a success with Pat's winning the Under 19 SSE Airtricity League with a 3–2 win over Derry City under 19's in the final at Maginn Park, with Feely getting himself on the scoresheet. The team included several players that broke through to the Pat's first team and beyond in the League of Ireland and English Football Leagues, including Jamie McGrath, Darragh Markey, Jack Bayly, Fuad Sule, Paul Rooney and JJ Lunney.

St Patrick's Athletic

2014–2015
Feely's first involvement with the first team at St Patrick's Athletic came on 9 September 2014 when he came off the bench for the last 5 minutes of the 2014 Leinster Senior Cup Final, which saw his side win 2–1 to claim the trophy and Feely's first medal at senior level. His first senior league appearance came on 17 October 2014 when he replaced Killian Brennan in the 72nd minute of a 2–0 defeat to Athlone Town at Richmond Park. He did not feature in the first team in 2015 due to his heavy involvement with the clubs Under 19's side and also Kildare GAA Minors.

2016 season
His next involvement with the first team came in pre-season 2016, when manager Liam Buckley decided that he would convert Feely from a right winger to a centre back and his next appearance came in February 2016, coming off the bench in a 3–1 defeat away to Bray Wanderers in the Leinster Senior Cup. Feely's first career goal at senior level came on 18 April 2016, when he scored the winner in extra time away to Dundalk in the League Cup. He was an unused substitute in the 2016 League of Ireland Cup Final as his side beat Limerick 4–1. The 2016 season saw Feely make 17 appearances across all competitions, scoring 1 goal.

2017 season
With Feely too old for the under 19's, the 2017 season was his first season solely with the first team. His first ever League of Ireland goal came in a 1–1 draw with Galway United on 14 April 2017, when he powered home a header from a Conan Byrne corner. Feely featured 23 times across the season in a young squad that was in a relegation battle right until the final day of the season, retaining their place in the division with a 1–1 draw against Derry City at Maginn Park.

Waterford

2018 season
Feely signed for newly promoted Waterford on 3 January 2018. Having played a handful of games at right back for St Patrick's Athletic the previous season, Waterford manager Alan Reynolds deemed it to be Feely's best position, making him his first choice in that position, as he made his debut on the opening night of the season in a 2–1 win over Derry City at the RSC. Feely's first goal for Waterford came on 18 May 2018, scoring in a 3–6 defeat at home to Limerick. He followed that up by scoring the opening goal in a 4–0 win over Derry City a week later. Along with his 2 goals, Feely made 34 appearances in all competitions for Waterford in his debut season at the club, as they finished in 4th place. Feely was named the club's Young Player of the Year after an excellent first season with the club for the 21 year old. He signed a new 1 year contract with the club on 3 December 2018.

2019 season
Feely had to wait until 13 September for his first goal of the season, helping his side to a 2–1 win over Bohemians at Dalymount Park. The season turned out to be a disappointment for the club as they finished in 6th place, but on a personal level it was a success for Feely as he featured in 40 games, scored 2 goals and was named as Waterford's Player of the Year after another impressive year for the right back.

Return to St Patrick's Athletic
On 19 November 2019, it was announced that Feely had resigned for St Patrick's Athletic under new manager Stephen O'Donnell. He made his second debut for the club on the opening night of the season against his old side Waterford. He was sent off in a Dublin derby on 28 February 2020 as his side lost 1–0 to rivals Shelbourne at Tolka Park. Feely scored his first goal since his return to the club on 26 September when he headed home a Robbie Benson corner kick in a 2–0 win over Shelbourne at Richmond Park. Feely played in all but one of the club's league and cup games over the course of the shortened season due to the Coronavirus pandemic, as his side missed out on European football on the final day of the season, finishing in 6th place.

Bohemians
On 5 January 2021, it was announced that Feely had signed for one of his brother Kevin's former clubs, Bohemians, ahead of the 2021 season. Feely scored his first goal for the club in the 2021 FAI Cup Final at the Aviva Stadium, as his side lost to his old club St Patrick's Athletic.

Barrow 
On 5 January 2023, Feely signed a one-and-a-half year contract with English Football League club Barrow.

Personal life
Feely was born in Brussels, Belgium, with his family living there in the 1990s while his father had a job there. When he was three years old, the family moved back to Ireland, living in Tramore, County Waterford. While living in Tramore, Feely attended Waterford matches and was also a ball boy on occasion. The family later moved to Athy, County Kildare.

Feely played Gaelic football growing up, progressing from Athy GAA to county level with Kildare GAA at Minor level, all while playing for St Patrick's Athletic at Under 19 level. He starred in the 2015 Leinster Minor Football Championship against Longford GAA at Croke Park, winning 2–15 to 1–9.

Rory's brother Kevin Feely is a former professional footballer who played with Bohemians, Charlton Athletic, Carlisle United, AFC Wimbledon and Newport County, before retiring in 2015 to return to full time education as well as playing Gaelic football with Kildare GAA.

While playing Gaelic football with Kildare GAA at Minor level, Feely was a teammate of future Normal People starring actor, Paul Mescal.

International career
Feely made one appearance for the Republic of Ireland U21s, playing in a friendly against Republic of Ireland Amateurs on 11 February 2017.

Career statistics
Professional appearances – correct as of 11 February 2023.

Honours

Club
League of Ireland Cup: (1)
St Patrick's Athletic — 2016
Leinster Senior Cup: (1)
St Patrick's Athletic – 2014

Individual
Waterford Player of the Year: (1)
2019
Waterford Young Player of the Year: (1)
2018

References

External links
 
 
 

1997 births
Living people
Footballers from Brussels
St Patrick's Athletic F.C. players
Waterford F.C. players
Bohemian F.C. players
Barrow A.F.C. players
League of Ireland players
Association football defenders
Republic of Ireland association footballers
Republic of Ireland youth international footballers
Republic of Ireland under-21 international footballers
Gaelic footballers who switched code
Athy Gaelic footballers